The Big Bad Swim is a 2006 American independent film about a group of adults who enroll in an adult education beginner's swim class. The film takes place in southeastern Connecticut, in the town of Uncasville. It premiered at the 2006 Tribeca Film Festival and was released on DVD in North America on July 24, 2007.

Plot
The film is an ensemble comedy-drama that focuses on the group of people, each of whom is afraid of the water, that join an adult swim class. Amy Pierson (Paget Brewster) is a  calculus teacher going through a divorce with her husband, Paul (Grant Aleksander).  Noah Owens (Jeff Branson) is the teacher of the swim class who is battling depression until he meets Jordan (Jess Weixler), a beautiful casino dealer/exotic dancer who wants to learn how to swim. Other members in the class include a cop (Kevin Porter Young), a cocky woman who already knows how to swim (Liza Lapira), and a married couple (Todd Susman and Darla Hill). Jordan's brother, David (Avi Setton) and his obnoxious friend Hunter (Ricky Ullman) are trying to make a documentary about her.

Reception
Reviews for the film have been positive. , three of the four critics reviews on Rotten Tomatoes were positive. It won the award for Best American Independent Film at the Ft. Lauderdale International Film Festival.

References

External links
 
Variety Review by Ken Eisner
Seattle Weekly Review by Frank Paiva
Cinematical Review by Christopher Campbell
Dominican Life Review by Tom Condon

2006 films
American comedy-drama films
2006 comedy-drama films
Films set in Connecticut
Old Lyme, Connecticut
Swimming films
2006 directorial debut films
2000s English-language films
2000s American films